Oğuz Aydın (born 27 October 2000) is a Turkish professional footballer who plays as a winger for Alanyaspor. Born in the Netherlands, he is a youth international for Turkey.

Club career
Aydın began his senior career with Bucaspor in 2018, and moved to Bucaspor 1928 in 2019. He spent the 2019-20 season on loan with Karacabey Belediyespor. On 24 June 2021, he transferred to Alanyaspor signing a 5-year contract. He made his professional debut with Alanyaspor in a 6–3 Süper Lig win over Kayserispor on 18 October 2021.

International career
Born in the Netherlands, he is of Turkish descent. He represented the Turkey U19s in a 1–1 2019 UEFA European Under-19 Championship tie with the Denmark U19s on 24 March 2018.

References

External links
 

2000 births
Living people
Footballers from The Hague
Turkish footballers
Turkey youth international footballers
Dutch footballers
Dutch people of Turkish descent
Bucaspor footballers
Alanyaspor footballers
Association football wingers
Süper Lig players
TFF Second League players
TFF Third League players